The 2006 Widnes Vikings season was their first in the 2006 Rugby League National Leagues since their relegation from the Super League the previous season. The Widnes Vikings aimed for immediate promotion back to the top tier eventually finishing second in the league and making it to the Grand Final. They ultimately fell short of this goal being defeated by the Hull Kingston Rovers by 29 points to 16.

2006 fixtures and results

2006 National League One Results

2006 Challenge Cup Results

2006 National League Cup

2006 squad

References 

Widnes Vikings seasons
Widnes Vikings season
Widnes Vikings season